East Lucas Township is a township in Johnson County, Iowa, USA.

Demographics 

The median household income in the township is $79,500.

References

Townships in Johnson County, Iowa
Townships in Iowa